Gallowglass is a British television serial adaptation of the 1990 Ruth Rendell novel of the same name. It is an emotional story of obsessive love, lust and fear.

Plot
Joe (Sheen) is saved by Sandor (Rhys), from committing suicide in front of an oncoming tube train. Sandor now demands his absolute loyalty and teaches Joe that he is now a 'gallowglass', a servant of a chief. So deep is Joe's gratitude that he helps with the kidnapping of a young wealthy married woman, Nina (Whiteley), that Sandor is obsessed with. His adoptive sister Tilly is also involved in the plot, which also involves the abduction of the daughter of Nina's bodyguard.

Nina and the child are both released when the ransom is paid, and soon after this Sandor jumps to his death into the path of a train as Joe watches. Nina is then lured to her death by Gianni, a former gay partner of Sandor, and her body is found buried in woodland a few days later. Sandor's mother, who had no other children, then accepts Joe as her second son, and he begins a relationship with Tilly.

Cast
 Michael Sheen – Joe
 Paul Rhys – Sandor
 Arkie Whiteley – Nina
 John McArdle – Paul
 Claire Hackett – Tilly
 Gary Waldhorn – Ralph Apsoland
 Harriet Owen – Jessica

References

External links

BBC television dramas
1990s British drama television series
1993 British television series debuts
1993 British television series endings
Television shows based on British novels
1990s British television miniseries
English-language television shows
Television shows set in the United Kingdom